Gede Doub is a lwa in Haitian Vodou who can endow people with the gift of "second sight" (clairvoyance).

Footnotes

Notes

References 

Haitian Vodou gods